Gylippidae is a family of solifuges, first described by Carl Friedrich Roewer in 1933.

Genera 
, the World Solifugae Catalog accepts the following five genera:

 Acanthogylippus Birula, 1913
 Bdellophaga Wharton, 1981
 Gylippus Simon, 1879
 Lipophaga Purcell, 1903
 Trichotoma Lawrence, 1968

References 

Solifugae
Arachnid families